is a city in Aichi Prefecture, Japan. , the city had an estimated population of 83,891 in 35,798 households, and a population density of 1,828 persons per km2..

Geography
Chita is located in northwestern Chita Peninsula in southern Aichi Prefecture, at the head of the Chita Peninsula with an altitude of 50 to 70 meters above sea level. It is bordered by Ise Bay to the east.

Climate
The city has a climate characterized by hot and humid summers, and relatively mild winters (Köppen climate classification Cfa).  The average annual temperature in Chita is 15.5 °C. The average annual rainfall is 1638 mm with September as the wettest month. The temperatures are highest on average in August, at around 27.5 °C, and lowest in January, at around 4.4 °C.

Demographics
Per Japanese census data, the population of Chita has been increasing steadily over the past 70 years.

Neighboring municipalities
Aichi Prefecture
Tōkai
Tokoname
Agui
Higashiura

History

Late modern period
The villages of Okada, Hinaga, Kanazawa, Yahata, Shinwa and Sori were created within Chita District, Aichi Prefecture, wth  the establishment of the modern municipalities system on October 1, 1889.

Okada was elevated to town status in 1903, followed by Yahata in 1922 and Asahi in 1952.

Contemporary history
The town of Chita was established on April 1, 1955, by the merger of the former towns of Okada, Asahi and Yawata.

Chita was elevated to city status on September 1, 1970.

Government

Chita has a mayor-council form of government with a directly elected mayor and a unicameral city legislature of 18 members. The city contributes one member to the Aichi Prefectural Assembly.  In terms of national politics, the city is part of Aichi District 8 of the lower house of the Diet of Japan.

Economy

Chita has a strong industrial base along its coastline, with electrical power plants, chemical and petrochemical plants and refineries predominating. The interior remains agricultural, with crops including Petasites japonicus and onions, although most agriculture is dependent on irrigation.  Chubu Electric operates the large Chita Power Station in the city. Companies headquartered in Chita include:
Chubu Shiryo, fodder manufacturer
San-ei Sucrochemical, sugar manufacturer
Chita LNG, energy
Tohmei Industries, aerospace components

Education

Schools
Chita has ten public elementary schools and five public junior high schools operated by the city government, and one public high school operated by the Aichi Prefectural Board of Education. There is also one private high school.

Transportation

Railways
Meitetsu
Meitetsu Tokoname Line：-  -  -  -  -  -  -
Meitetsu Kōwa Line：-  -

Roads

Japan National Route

Local attractions

Okusa Castle
Shin Maiko Marine Park
Sori Greenery and Fureai Park

Notable people from Chita
Takuya Asao, professional baseball player
Koji Fukutani, professional baseball player
Ayumi Kinoshita, actress
Takeshi Yamasaki, professional baseball player
Tetsuya Yamato, professional kick-boxer

References

External links 

  

 
Cities in Aichi Prefecture
Populated coastal places in Japan